His Night Out is a 1935 American comedy film directed by William Nigh and written by Harry Clork and Doris Malloy. The film stars Edward Everett Horton, Irene Hervey, Jack La Rue, Robert McWade, Lola Lane and Willard Robertson. The film was released on October 1, 1935, by Universal Pictures.

Plot

Cast  
Edward Everett Horton as Homer B. Bitts
Irene Hervey as Peggy Taylor
Jack La Rue as Joe Ferranza
Robert McWade as Davis
Lola Lane as Lola
Willard Robertson as J.J. Trent
Oscar Apfel as Dr. Kraft
Theodore von Eltz as Parsons
Clara Kimball Young as Mrs. Davis
Ward Bond as Lanky
George Cleveland as Detective
Jack Mulhall as Salesman
Jack Norton as Dr. Singer
Dewey Robinson as Beef
Bill Burrud as Jimmie

References

External links 
 

1935 films
American comedy films
1935 comedy films
Universal Pictures films
Films directed by William Nigh
American black-and-white films
1930s English-language films
1930s American films